The Imperial Order of the Crown of India is an order in the British honours system. The Order was established by Queen Victoria when she became Empress of India in 1878. The Order was open only to women, and no appointments have been made since the Partition of India in 1947. The Order was limited to British princesses, wives or female relatives of Indian princes (female rulers like the Nawab Begums of Bhopal counted as such) and the wife or female relatives of any person who held the office of:
Viceroy of India
Governor of Madras
Governor of Bombay
Governor of Bengal
Commander-in-Chief India
Secretary of State for India
Governor-General of India

History
The Order of the Crown of India was established by Queen Victoria in 1878 as a companion order to the Order of Victoria and Albert.  The order's intent was to recognize women associated with India regardless of their social statuses.  In practice, the Order of the Crown of India was mostly conferred on royalty, wives of peers, wives of members of India's ruling classes and wives of civil servants stationed in India.  It is one of the few honors which was reserved for women only, such as the Order of Victoria and Albert and the Royal Family Order.

Queen Elizabeth II, then Princess Elizabeth, and her sister Princess Margaret were appointed to the Order by their father King George VI in June 1947, making them among the last women to be presented with the Order.  By the late 20th Century there were only four living recipients - Queen Elizabeth II, Queen Elizabeth the Queen Mother, Princess Margaret and Princess Alice, Duchess of Gloucester, who was the last ordinary member at the time of her death in 2004. With the death of the last surviving holder Queen Elizabeth II, the last active imperial Indian order became dormant in 2022.

Description

The members of the Order could use the post-nominal letters "CI", but did not acquire any special precedence or status due to it. Furthermore, they were entitled to wear the badge of the Order, which included Queen Victoria's Imperial Cypher, VRI (Victoria Regina Imperatrix). The letters were set in diamonds, pearls, and turquoises, and were together surrounded by a border of pearls surmounted by a figure of the Imperial Crown. The badge was worn and attached to a light blue bow, edged in white, on the left shoulder.

Recipients

1878–1900
1878: Alexandra, Princess of Wales
1878: Victoria, Princess Royal, Crown Princess of Germany
1878: Princess Alice, Grand Duchess of Hesse and by Rhine
1878: Princess Christian of Schleswig-Holstein
1878: Princess Louise, Marchioness of Lorne
1878: Princess Beatrice of the United Kingdom
1878: Maria Alexandrovna, Duchess of Edinburgh
1878: Augusta, Duchess of Cambridge
1878: Grand Duchess Augusta of Mecklenburg-Strelitz
1878: Princess Mary Adelaide, Duchess of Teck
1878: Maharani Bamba Singh
1878: Sultan Shah Jahan, Begum of Bhopal
1878: Maharani Sita Vilas Dawaji Ammani Anaro of Mysore
1878: Maharanee Jumnabai Sahib Gaekwad of Baroda (widow of Maharaja Khanderao)
1878: Dilawar un-Nisa Begum Sahiba, of Hyderabad
1878: Nawab Qudsia, Begum of Bhopal
1878: Vijaya Mohana Muktamba Bai Ammani Raja Sahib of Tanjore
1878: Maharani Swarnamoyee of Cossimbazar
1878: Elizabeth Campbell, Duchess of Argyll
1878: Georgina Gascoyne-Cecil, Marchioness of Salisbury
1878: Henrietta Vyner, Marchioness of Ripon, Vicerine of India
1878: Lady Mary Temple-Nugent-Brydges-Chandos-Grenville
1878: Mary Bruce, The Countess of Elgin
1878: The Countess of Mayo
1878: Lady Susan Bourke
1878: Mary Wood, Viscountess Halifax
1878: Lady Hobart (Mary Hobart, wife of Lord Hobart, Governor of the Presidency of Madras)
1878: Lady Jane Baring
1878: Anne Napier, Baroness Napier (wife of Francis Napier, 10th Lord Napier, Governor of the Presidency of Madras, 1866–1872)
1878: Edith Bulwer-Lytton, Countess of Lytton
1878: Harriette Lawrence, Baroness Lawrence
1878: Cecilia Northcote, Countess of Iddesleigh
1878: Catherine Frere, Lady Frere (wife of Sir Henry Frere, 1st Baronet, Governor of the Presidency of Bombay)
1878: Mary Temple, Lady Temple (wife of Sir Richard Temple, 1st Baronet, Governor of the Presidency of Bombay)
1878: Caroline Denison, Lady Denison (wife of Sir William Denison, Governor of the Presidency of Madras)
1878: Katherine Strachey, Lady Strachey (wife of Sir John Strachey, acting Viceroy of India 1872)
1878: Jane Gathorne-Hardy, Countess of Cranbrook
1878: Princess Frederica of Hanover
1878: Princess Marie of Hanover
1879: Thyra, Duchess of Cumberland
1879: Louise Margaret Duchess of Connaught
1879: Lady Napier of Magdala (wife of Robert Napier, 1st Baron Napier of Magdala, Commander-in-Chief India 1870–1876 and acting Viceroy of India, 1862–1863)
1879: Lady Frances Cunynghame
1879: Dowager Lady Pottinger (widow of Sir Henry Pottinger, Governor of the Presidency of Madras 1848–1854)
1881: Bharani Thirunal Lakshmi Bayi, Senior Rani of Attingal
1881: Lady Fergusson (Olive Fergusson, wife of Sir James Fergusson, 6th Baronet, Governor of the Presidency of Bombay, 1880–1885)
1881: Mrs William Patrick Adam (Emily Adam, widow of William Patrick Adam, Governor of the Presidency of Madras 1880–1881)
1882: Helen, Duchess of Albany
1883: Lady Grant Duff (Anna Julia Grant Duff, wife of Sir Mountstuart Grant Duff, Governor of the Presidency of Madras 1881–1886)
1884: Edith Fergusson (daughter of Sir James Fergusson, 6th Baronet, Governor of the Presidency of Bombay, 1880–1885)
1884: The Countess of Dufferin (wife of Frederick Hamilton-Temple-Blackwood, Earl of Dufferin, Viceroy of India, 1884–1888)
1885: Lady Randolph Spencer-Churchill (wife of Lord Randolph Churchill, Secretary of State for India, 1885–1886)
1885: Lady Reay (Fanny Georgiana Jane Mackay, wife of Donald Mackay, 11th Lord Reay, Governor of the Presidency of Bombay 1885–1890)
1886: Viscountess Cross (Georgina Cross, wife of Richard Assheton Cross, 1st Viscount Cross, Secretary of State for India 1886–1892)
1887: Princess Louise of Wales
1887: Princess Victoria of Wales
1887: Princess Maud of Wales
1887: Maharanee Sunity Devee of Kuch Behar
1888: Maud Petty-Fitzmaurice, Marchioness of Lansdowne, Vicerine of India
1889: Princess Helena Victoria of Schleswig-Holstein
1889: Princess Victoria Mary of Teck
1890: Lady Harris (Lucy Ada Harris, wife of George Harris, 4th Baron Harris, Governor of the Presidency of Bombay, 1890–1895)
1891: Maharanee Sakhiabai Raje Sahib Scindia Bahadur, Regent of Gwalior (widow of Maharaja Sir Jayajirao Scindia Bahadur)
1891: Lady Wenlock (Constance Mary Lawley, wife of Beilby Lawley, 3rd Baron Wenlock, Governor of the Presidency of Madras 1891–1896)
1892: Maharanee Chimnabai Sahib Gaekwad of Baroda (wife of Maharaja Sayajirao Gaekwad III)
1892: Lady Nandkuverbai Bhagvatsinh Jadeja, Rani Sahib of Gondal
1893: Maharani Kempananjammanni Devi of Mysore (wife of Maharaja Chamaraja Wodeyar X)
1893: Marie, Crown Princess of Romania
1893: Princess Victoria Melita of Saxe-Coburg and Gotha
1893: Princess Aribert of Anhalt
1894: The Countess of Elgin (wife of Victor Bruce, 9th Earl of Elgin, Viceroy of India, 1894–1899)
1895: Mrs Henry Fowler (Ellen Fowler, wife of Henry Fowler, later Viscount Wolverhampton, Secretary of State for India, 1894–1895)
1895: The Lady Sandhurst (wife of William Mansfield, 1st Baron Sandhurst, later Viscount Sandhurst, Governor of the Presidency of Bombay, 1895–1900)
1895: Lady George Hamilton (wife of Lord George Hamilton, Secretary of State for India, 1895–1903)
1897: Alexandra, Hereditary Princess of Hohenlohe-Langenburg
1897: Maharani Sahiba of Udaipur (wife of Maharajadhiraja Fateh Singh)
1897: Nawab Shamsi Jahan, Begum Sahiba of Murshidabad
1897: Lady Havelock (Anne Havelock, wife of Sir Arthur Havelock, Governor of the Presidency of Madras, 1896-1900)
1899: Lady Curzon of Kedleston, Vicerine of India
1900: Princess Margaret of Connaught
1900: Lady Northcote (wife of Henry Northcote, 1st Baron Northcote, Governor of the Presidency of Bombay, 1900–1903)
1900: Lady Roberts (wife of Frederick Roberts, Baron Roberts, Commander-in-Chief India 1885–1893)
1900: Lady Stewart (Marina Katherine Stewart, widow of General Sir Donald Stewart, 1st Baronet, Commander-in-Chief India 1881–1885)
1900: Lady White (Amelia Maria White, wife of General Sir George White, Commander-in-Chief India 1893–1898)
1900: Lady Mary Katharine Lockhart (née Eccles; widow of General Sir William Stephen Alexander Lockhart, Commander in Chief India, 1898–1900)
1900: Lady Ampthill (wife of Arthur Russell, 2nd Baron Ampthill, Governor of the Presidency of Madras, 1900–1905)

1901–1947

1909: The Countess of Minto (wife of Gilbert Elliot-Murray-Kynynmound, 4th Earl of Minto, Viceroy of India, 1905–1910)
1910: Lady Hardinge of Penshurst (wife of Charles Hardinge, 1st Baron Hardinge of Penshurst, Viceroy of India, 1910–1916)
1911: Princess Patricia of Connaught (Coronation of George V)
1911: Princess Charlotte of Prussia, Duchess of Saxe-Meiningen (Coronation of George V)
1911: The Marchioness of Crewe (wife of Robert Crewe-Milnes, 1st Marquess of Crewe, Secretary of State for India, 1910–1911)
1911: Kaikhusrau Jahan, Begum of Bhopal
1911: Maharani Sri Nundkanvarba of Bhavnagar
1916: The Viscountess Chelmsford (wife of Frederic Thesiger, 1st Viscount Chelmsford, Viceroy of India, 1916–1921)
1917: Lady Willingdon (wife of Freeman Freeman-Thomas, 1st Baron Willingdon, later Marquess of Willingdon, Governor of the Presidency of Bombay, 1913–1918; Governor of the Presidency of Madras, 1919–1924; Viceroy of India, 1931–1936)
1918: Maji Sahiba Girraj Kuar, Maharani of Bharatpur, Regent of Bharatpur, 1900–1918
1919: Mary, Princess Royal and Countess of Harewood
1921: Alice Isaacs, Countess of Reading, Vicerine of India
1926: Lady Irwin (wife of Edward Frederick Lindley Wood, 1st Baron Irwin, later Earl of Halifax, Viceroy of India, 1926–1931)
1927: The Countess of Lytton (wife of Victor Bulwer-Lytton, 2nd Earl of Lytton, Viceroy of India, 1925–1926)
1928: Shrimati Chinkuraja Scindia, Senior Maharani of Gwalior
1929: Puradam Thirunal Sethu Lakshmi Bayi, Regent Maharani of Travancore
1930: Lady Birdwood (wife of William Birdwood, 1st Baron Birdwood, Commander-in-Chief India, 1925–1930)
1931: Elizabeth Duchess of York
1932: Begum Mariam Sultana, Lady Ali Shah (widow of Aga Khan II)
1935: Maharani Bhatianiji Sri Ajab Kanwarji Sahib, of Bikaner, Rajputana
1935: Lady Beatrix Taylour Stanley
1936: Doreen Hope, Marchioness of Linlithgow, Vicerine of India
1937: Princess Alice, Duchess of Gloucester
1937: Princess Marina, Duchess of Kent
1937: Doreen Knatchbull Lady Brabourne
1943: The Viscountess Wavell (wife of Archibald Wavell, Viscount Wavell, later Earl Wavell, Viceroy of India, 1943–1947)
1945: Mrs Leopold Stennett Amery (Florence Amery, wife of Leopold Stennett Amery, war-time Secretary of State for India, 1940–1945)
1946: Maharani Tara Devi of Jammu and Kashmir
1947: Edwina, Viscountess Mountbatten of Burma, Vicerine of India
1947: Princess Elizabeth of the United Kingdom
1947: Princess Margaret of the United Kingdom
1947: Agnes Anne, Baroness Clydesmuir (wife of John Colville, 1st Baron Clydesmuir, Governor of the Presidency of Bombay)

Sources 

 

Orders, decorations, and medals of British India
British honours system

Colonial orders of chivalry
Awards established in 1878
Awards disestablished in 1947
Crown of India, Order of the
Orders, decorations, and medals of the British Empire
Orders, decorations, and medals of India